The following is a list of unidentified, or formerly unidentified, sounds. All of the sound files in this article have been sped up by at least a factor of 16 to increase intelligibility by condensing them and raising the frequency from infrasound to a more audible and reproducible range.

Unidentified sounds 

The following unidentified sounds have been detected by the U.S. National Oceanic and Atmospheric Administration (NOAA) using its Equatorial Pacific Ocean autonomous hydrophone array.

Upsweep 

Upsweep is an unidentified sound detected on the American NOAA's equatorial autonomous hydrophone arrays. This sound was present when the Pacific Marine Environmental Laboratory began recording its sound surveillance system, SOSUS, in August 1991. It consists of a long train of narrow-band upsweeping sounds of several seconds in duration each. The source level is high enough to be recorded throughout the Pacific.

The sound appears to be seasonal, generally reaching peaks in spring and autumn, but it is unclear whether this is due to changes in the source or seasonal changes in the propagation environment. Scientists/researchers of NOAA speculate the sound to be underwater volcanic activity. The Upsweep's level of sound (volume) has been declining since 1991, but it can still be detected on NOAA's  equatorial autonomous hydrophone arrays.

Whistle 

This sound, dubbed the Whistle, was recorded by the eastern Pacific autonomous hydrophone deployed at 08°N 110°W on July 7, 1997 at 07:30GMT. According to NOAA, the Whistle is similar to volcanogenic sounds previously recorded in the Mariana volcanic arc of the Pacific Ocean. NOAA also stated that locating the source of an event requires at least three recording instruments, and since Whistle was only recorded on the NW hydrophone, the sound could have traveled a great distance from its source volcano before detection.

NOAA (formerly unidentified)

Bloop 

Bloop is the name given to an ultra-low-frequency and extremely powerful underwater sound detected by the U.S. National Oceanic and Atmospheric Administration (NOAA) in 1997.  The sound is consistent with the noises generated by icequakes in large icebergs, or large icebergs scraping the ocean floor.

Analysis 

The sound's source was roughly triangulated to a remote point in the south Pacific Ocean west of the southern tip of South America, and the sound was detected several times by the Equatorial Pacific Ocean autonomous hydrophone array. 

NOAA's Christopher Fox did not believe its origin was man-made, such as a submarine or bomb. While the audio profile of Bloop does resemble that of a living creature, the source was a mystery both because it was different from known sounds and because it was several times louder than the loudest recorded animal, the blue whale.

The NOAA Vents Program has attributed Bloop to a large icequake. Numerous icequakes share similar spectrograms with Bloop, as well as the amplitude necessary to spot them despite ranges exceeding . This was found during the tracking of iceberg A53a as it disintegrated near South Georgia Island in early 2008. If this is indeed the origin of Bloop, the iceberg(s) involved in generating the sound were most likely between Bransfield Straits and the Ross Sea, or possibly at Cape Adare in Antarctica, a well-known source of cryogenic signals.

Julia 

Julia is a sound recorded on March 1, 1999, by the U.S. National Oceanic and Atmospheric Administration (NOAA). NOAA said the source of the sound was most likely a large iceberg that had run aground off Antarctica.  It was loud enough to be heard over the entire Equatorial Pacific Ocean autonomous hydrophone array, with a duration of about 2 minutes and 43 seconds. Due to the uncertainty of the arrival azimuth, the point of origin could only be narrowed to between Bransfield Straits and Cape Adare.

Slow Down 

Slow Down is a sound recorded on May 19, 1997, in the Equatorial Pacific Ocean by the U.S. National Oceanic and Atmospheric Administration. The source of the sound was most likely a large iceberg as it became grounded.

Analysis 

The name was given because the sound slowly decreases in frequency over about seven minutes. It was recorded using an autonomous hydrophone array. The sound has been picked up several times each year since 1997. One of the hypotheses on the origin of the sound is moving ice in Antarctica. Sound spectrograms of vibrations caused by friction closely resemble the spectrogram of the Slow Down. This suggests the source of the sound could have been caused by the friction of a large ice sheet moving over land.

Train 

The Train is the name given to a sound recorded on March 5, 1997, on the Equatorial Pacific Ocean autonomous hydrophone array. The sound rises to a quasi-steady frequency. According to the NOAA, the origin of the sound is most likely generated by a very large iceberg grounded in the Ross Sea, near Cape Adare.

Other
 Bio-duck, a quacking-like sound produced by the Antarctic minke whale.
 The Ping, described as "acoustic anomalies" whose "sound[s] scare sea animals". It is heard in the Fury and Hecla Strait of northern Canada. It is being investigated by Canadian military authorities. 
 The Forest Grove Sound, a sound heard in Forest Grove, Oregon during February 2016.
 Moodus noises, strange sounds heard in Moodus, Connecticut, later attributed to microquakes.

Non-specific
 The Hum
 Mistpouffers or skyquakes, a phenomenon generally occurring near large bodies of water. Sound has been compared to distant cannonfire or thunder.
 Havana syndrome, grating noises of unknown origin purportedly heard by United States and Canadian embassy staff in Havana, Cuba.

See also 
52-hertz whale
Numbers station
Tinnitus
UVB-76

References 

List of unexplained sounds
unexplained sounds